Beauharnois-Huntingdon was a former provincial electoral district in the Montérégie region of  Quebec, Canada that elected members to the National Assembly of Quebec.  It was located in and around the area between Beauharnois, Quebec and Huntingdon, Quebec.

It was created for the 1989 election, from the existing Beauharnois and Huntingdon districts, which ceased to exist. Its final election was in 1998.  In the 2003 election it disappeared and Beauharnois and Huntingdon districts were recreated.

Members of the National Assembly

External links
Election results
 Election results (National Assembly)
 Election results (Quebecpolitique.com)
Maps
1992–2001 changes (Flash)

Former provincial electoral districts of Quebec